Michael Anthony Walsh (born 13 August 1954) is a former professional footballer who works as a football agent. A striker, he spent his club career in England and Portugal. Born in England, he represented the Republic of Ireland national team at international level.

Club career
Walsh began his professional career at Blackpool in 1973, making his debut in a goalless draw at Fulham on 12 September. He went on to score 72 league goals for the Seasiders in 180 games during his five years at the club. His strike in a 3–2 win against Sunderland at Bloomfield Road on 1 February 1975 earned him the "Goal of the Season" award on the BBC's Match of the Day. He signed for Everton in August 1978 for a fee of £375,000, a record fee for Blackpool at the time.

He had a spell with Cape Town City in 1978. He spent six years playing in Portugal with FC Porto, and appeared in their 2–1 defeat by Juventus in the 1984 UEFA Cup Winners' Cup Final in Basel.

International career
The highlight of his international career was when he scored the only goal of the game as Ireland defeated the Soviet Union in a World Cup qualifier in Dublin in September 1984.

Legacy
Walsh was inducted into the Hall of Fame at Bloomfield Road, when it was officially opened by former Blackpool player Jimmy Armfield in April 2006. Organised by the Blackpool Supporters Association, Blackpool fans around the world voted on their all-time heroes. Five players from each decade are inducted; Walsh is in the 1970s.

Career statistics

Club

International

Scores and results list Republic of Ireland's goal tally first, score column indicates score after each Walsh goal.

Honours
Porto
Primeira Liga: 1984–85 1985–86
Taça de Portugal: 1983–84
Supertaça Cândido de Oliveira: 1981, 1983, 1984
UEFA Cup Winners' Cup runner-up: 1983–84

See also
 List of Republic of Ireland international footballers born outside the Republic of Ireland

References

Further reading

External links
Independent site profile
Walsh in the Blackpool Supporters Association Hall of Fame
Irish Footballers in Europe Profile

1954 births
Living people
Sportspeople from Chorley
Republic of Ireland association footballers
Republic of Ireland expatriate association footballers
Republic of Ireland international footballers
Chorley F.C. players
Blackpool F.C. players
Everton F.C. players
Queens Park Rangers F.C. players
FC Porto players
S.C. Espinho players
S.C. Salgueiros players
Primeira Liga players
Expatriate footballers in Portugal
Irish expatriate sportspeople in Portugal
Cape Town City F.C. (NFL) players
Expatriate soccer players in South Africa
Irish expatriate sportspeople in South Africa
Association football forwards
National Football League (South Africa) players